Brode may refer to:

People 
Ben Brode, American video game designer
Charles Brode (died 1901), American merchant
Harold L. Brode, American physicist
Robert Brode (1900-1986), American physicist
Wallace R. Brode (1900-1974), American chemist

Places 
 Brode, Škofja Loka, Škofja Loka, Slovenia
 Brode, Vransko, Vransko, Slovenia
 Brøde Island, off the southern tip of South Georgia

See also 
Broda (disambiguation)
Braude (disambiguation)
Broder